This is a list of the top twenty most visited museums in each region in 2020, based upon the annual reports of museum attendance from the Art Newspaper Review and the Museum Index of the Themed Entertainment Association. If 2020 figures are not available, earlier figures are shown, with the year indicated. The 2020 figures illustrate the enormous drop in museum attendance due to the COVID-19 pandemic.  Museum attendance globally fell by more than 70 percent in 2020.

Europe

North America

Asia

Australia and New Zealand

South  America

See also
 List of most-visited museums
 List of most-visited art museums
 List of most visited palaces and monuments
 List of most-visited museums in the United States
 List of most visited museums in the United Kingdom

References

Lists of art museums and galleries
Lists of museums
Museums by region
Most visited museums